The Nipigon River is located in Thunder Bay District in Northwestern Ontario, Canada. It is the largest tributary of Lake Superior.

Since 1943,  of the Ogoki River basin has been diverted to the headwaters of the Little Jackfish River, a tributary of Lake Nipigon. This increased flow has caused significant erosion and landslides along the river.

History
The Nipigon River was formerly known for the size and quantity of the brook trout that were to be found there. However, four dams built on the Nipigon led to a major decline in their population. The four dams are as follows:
 Cameron Falls Dam built in 1918
 Virgin Falls Dam built in 1925
 Alexander Dam built in 1930
 Pine Portage Dam built in 1950

Modern uses
Three hydroelectric dams on the Nipigon, Cameron Falls Dam, Alexander Dam, and Pine Portage Dam (all operated by Ontario Power Generation), provided 2,144 gigawatt-hours in 2000. This however effectively makes travel via boat between Lake Nipigon and Lake Superior impossible. The river is also a popular fishing destination.

Fishing
46 fish species have been identified in the Nipigon River, including the rare sturgeon, cisco, and  “coaster” brook trout.

In 1915, Dr Cook caught the world record for the largest brook trout, also known as speckled trout or coaster trout. Four years later, Prince Edward, Prince of Wales (later King Edward VIII and Duke of Windsor), spent time fishing on the Nipigon; a trout that he caught was mounted and today is displayed at the National Archives of Canada. The river also has a run of lake trout, rainbow trout and salmon during various times of the year. The reservoir between the dams are good fishery, especially for large speckled trout and lake trout.

Fishing starts the first of May until freeze up at the end of November. The river can be accessed from boat, or fished by shore from various strategic locations.

See also
 List of Ontario rivers

References

External links

 Ontario Ministry of Natural Resources – Nipigon River
 Ontario Power Generation – Nipigon River

Rivers of Thunder Bay District
Tributaries of Lake Superior